Ho Sin Tung (born 1986) is a visual artist who lives and works in Hong Kong.

Background
Ho was born in Hong Kong, and grew up in Tai Po before moving further north near Lok Ma Chau. Ho began her artistic training at the age of three when she attended workshops in the studio of Hong Kong painter Gaylord Chan (陳餘生). She graduated with a BFA from the Fine Arts Department of The Chinese University of Hong Kong in 2008. Ho participated in SeMA Mediacity Biennale Seoul (2014) and the 9th Shanghai Biennale (2012), and received Hong Kong Arts Development Award 2012 – Award for Young Artist and Hong Kong Contemporary Art Award 2012.	

Ho’s work is multidisciplinary and cross-media. She uses a variety of texts and materials and weaves impressions of varied objects, stories, movies, as well as personal memories and imaginations into various forms of representations. She may use pencil, graphite and watercolour as art media in combination with found and ready-made images such as stickers, maps, charts, and rubber-stamps to create artwork. She also creates video art and process-led projects that interpret and extend different narrative frameworks. The cinema is frequent referenced in her work, and literature and film culture are also sources of inspiration.

Ho is represented by Hanart TZ Gallery in Hong Kong and Chambers Fine Art in New York and Beijing.

Artist residencies
 Living in Creative Fongshan, Kaohsiung, Taiwan (Oct 2016)
 Vermont Studio Centre, Johnson, Vermont, US (Oct – Nov 2013)
 SeMA Nanji Residency, Seoul Museum of Art, Seoul, South Korea (Jul – Sep 2013)

Exhibitions

Selected solo exhibitions 
 2017 – Maybe They Will Die For Us Tomorrow, Oil Street Art Space, Hong Kong
 2017 – Surfaced, Chambers Fine Art, New York, US
 2016 – Dusty Landscape, Chambers Fine Art, Beijing, China
 2015 – Icarus Shrugged, Hanart TZ Gallery, Hong Kong
 2013 – The Void of Course Monday, Para Site, Art Basel Hong Kong
 2012 – Hong Kong Inter-vivos Film Festival, Hanart TZ Gallery, Hong Kong
 2011 – You Are Running A Business Called None of My Business, Abu Dhabi Art Fair, Abu Dhabi, UAE
 2011 – Folie à deux, Experimenta, Hong Kong
 2010 – Don’t shoot the messenger, Hanart TZ Gallery, Hong Kong

Selected group exhibitions 
 2019 – Shek O-Sublime, Gallery EXIT, Hong Kong
 2018 – The D-Tale, Video Art from the Pearl River Delta, Times Art Center, Berlin, Germany
 2018 – How To See [What Isn’t There], Langen Foundation, Neuss, Germany
 2018 – Wan Chai Grammatica: Past, Present, Future Tense, Pao Galleries, Hong Kong Arts Centre, Hong Kong
 2018 – Women in Art: Hong Kong, Sotheby's Hong Kong Gallery, Hong Kong
 2017 – CUHK Fine Arts Department 60th Anniversary Feature Exhibition, Cattle Depot, Hong Kong
 2017 – Ambiguously Yours: Gender in Hong Kong Popular Culture, M+ Pavilion, West Kowloon Cultural District, Hong Kong
 2016 – Living in Creative Fongshan, C9-15 Dayi Area, Pier-2 Art Center, Kaohsiung, Taiwan
 2016 – Animamix Biennale:  Space in Mind, MoCA Shanghai, Shanghai, China
 2016 – The (non) Existing Memory of Hong Kong in Literary Text, Comix Home Base, Hong Kong
 2016 – Next Destination: Hong Kong, Exhibition of William Lim’s Living Collection, Sotheby's Hong Kong Gallery, Hong Kong
 2015 – The Human Body: Measure and Norms, Blindspot Gallery, Hong Kong
 2015 – A Journey of Innovation, Hong Kong Convention and Exhibition Centre, Hong Kong
 2015 – Polyphony III – Ecological Survey of Chinese Art – Pearl River Delta, Hall 3 of Art Museum of Nanjing University of the Arts, Nanjing, China 
 2015 – Here Is Where We Meet, Duddell’s, Hong Kong
 2015 – After/Image, Studio 52, Pure Art Foundation, Hong Kong
 2015 – Sovereign Asian Art Prize Finalists' Exhibition, SOHO189 Art Lane / Level 18, Hong Kong
 2014 – SeMA Biennale Mediacity Seoul 2014: Ghosts, Spies and Grandmothers, Seoul Museum of Art, Seoul, Korea; Korean Film Archive, Seoul, Korea 
 2014 – The Part In The Story Where A Part Becomes A Part Of Something Else, Witte de With, Rotterdam, The Netherlands
 2014 – Animamix Biennale 2013–14: This Slow.That Fast, Run Run Shaw Creative Media Centre, City University of Hong Kong, Hong Kong
 2013 – Hong Kong Contemporary Art Award 2012, Hong Kong Museum of Art, Hong Kong 
 2013 – Framed: Ai Wei Wei and Hong Kong Artists, Duddell's, Hong Kong 
 2013 – HETEROTOPIA, SeMA Nanji Exhibition Hall, Seoul, Korea
 2013 – The Floating Eternity, Para Site, Hong Kong
 2013 – Drawing: Expression and Limit, Hall 2 of Art Museum of Nanjing University of the Arts, Nanjing, China 
 2013 – The Rencontres Internationales Paris/Berlin/Madrid, Haus der Kulturen der Welt, Berlin, Germany 
 2013 – Hong Kong Eye, ArtisTree, Hong Kong
 2012 – The Rencontres Internationales Paris/Berlin/Madrid, Palais de Tokyo, Paris, France 
 2012 – Hong Kong Eye, Saatchi Gallery, London, UK
 2012 – The 9th Shanghai Biennale: Reactivation, Shanghai Museum of Contemporary Art, Shanghai, China 
 2012 – The Repository of Coherent Babbles, Southsite, Hong Kong
 2012 – CAFAM.FUTURE, China Central Academy of Fine Arts Museum, Beijing, China
 2012 – 'Traits, Ox Warehouse 2nd floor showroom, Macau
 2012 – Market Force, Osage Kwun Tong, Hong Kong
 2012 – The 17th Hong Kong Independent Short Film & Video Awards, Hong Kong Space Museum, Hong Kong
 2011 – Octopus, Hanina Contemporary Art, Tel Aviv, Israel
 2011 – Urban Utopia: if and only if, Goethe Institute, Hong Kong
 2011 – Societe Generale Chinese Art Awards 2010 Tour Exhibition, Hong Kong / Beijing / Shanghai / Taipei / Paris / Singapore / London
 2010 – You’re Here, I’m Not., Osage Gallery, Kwun Tong, Hong Kong
 2010 – Drawing Out Conversations: Taipei, Nanhai Gallery, Taipei, Taiwan
 2010 – Shifting Topography, Hanart Square, Hong Kong
 2010 – The Hong Kong Contemporary Art Biennial Awards 2009, Hong Kong Museum of Art, Hong Kong 
 2010 – Labium, Gallery EXIT, Hong Kong
 2009 – A place changes when we look, agnes b's Librairie Galerie, Hong Kong
 2009 – Fresh, Amelia Johnson Contemporary, Hong Kong
 2009 – Drawing Out Conversations: Hong Kong Leg, Studio Bibliothèque, Fotan Artists Open Studios 2009, Fotan, Hong Kong
 2008 – Hong Kong, Hong Kong, Hanart TZ Gallery, Hong Kong

Selected Awards
 2015 – Finalist of Sovereign Asian Art Prize, Sovereign Art Foundation
 2013 – Finalist of Lu Xun Culture Award - Award for Best Artwork, Soho.com and Lu Xun Culture Foundation 
 2012 – Hong Kong Arts Development Award 2012 - Award for Young Artist, Hong Kong Arts Development Council
 2012 – Hong Kong Contemporary Art Award 2012, Hong Kong Museum of Art
 2010 – Finalist of Societe Generale Chinese Art Awards 2010, Societe Generale
 2009 – Finalist of Hong Kong Contemporary Art Biennial Awards 2009, Hong Kong Museum of Art 
 2008 – Hui Yeung Sing Fine Arts Award, Chinese University of Hong Kong
 2007 – Cheung's Fine Arts Awards, Chinese University of Hong Kong
 2006 – Gaylord Chan Painting Award, Chinese University of Hong Kong
 2006 – Lui Lup-fun Creative Award, Chinese University of Hong Kong

References

1986 births
Hong Kong artists
Hong Kong women artists
Living people